Ahmet Oytun Özdoğan (born 16 June 1998) is a Turkish footballer who plays for Yeni Malatyaspor as a goalkeeper.

Club career
Özdoğan joined the youth academy of Fenerbahçe in 2014, and signed his first professional contract with them in 2018 before joining 52 Orduspor on loan. Özdoğan made his professional debut with Fenerbahçe in a 3-1 Süper Lig loss to Gaziantep F.K. on 19 December 2020.

International career
Özdoğan is a youth international for Turkey, having represented the Turkey U17s in a friendly 1–0 loss to the Luxembourg U17s on 9 April 2015.

References

External links

2000 births
Sportspeople from Denizli
Living people
Turkish footballers
Turkey youth international footballers
Association football goalkeepers
Fenerbahçe S.K. footballers
Yeni Malatyaspor footballers
Kırklarelispor footballers
Süper Lig players